The Shaksgam River is a left tributary of the Yarkand River. The river is also known as the Kelechin River and Muztagh River. It rises in the Gasherbrum, Urdok, Staghar, Singhi and Kyagar Glaciers in the Karakoram. It then flows in a general northwestern direction parallel to the Karakoram ridge line in  the Shaksgam Valley. It receives the waters of the Shimshal Braldu river and the Oprang river from the Pakistan-administered Hunza District before turning east and joining the Yarkand River. The stretch of the river's course between Shimshal Braldu and Oprang is used as the Pakistan–China border.

Administratively, the Chinese part of the valley is within the southernmost portions of Yarkand County (the source) and the Tashkurgan Tajik Autonomous County (lower course). India claims the entire valley as part of its Jammu and Kashmir state, now part of Ladakh.

History 
The river valley was explored in 1889 by Francis Younghusband (who referred to the Shaksgam as the Oprang)., and again in 1926 by Kenneth Mason, who confirmed the sources of the river.

Geography 
The upper river valley is used by climbers approaching the north face of K2.  The approach requires a crossing of the river, which is hazardous.  Between its confluence with the Shimshal Braldu River and its confluence with the Oprang River the river forms the border between China and Pakistan administered Kashmir.  The area is used as winter pastures by yak herdsmen from the village of Shimshal. Historically, the bed of the Yarkand river where Shaksgam joins it, was used for cultivation by farmers from the state of Hunza. The rulers of Hunza are said to have obtained these "territorial rights to Shaksgam" in the distant past.

The average annual temperature in the region can fall below freezing.

See also 
 Trans-Karakoram Tract
 Dafdar
 Yinsugaiti Glacier
 Sarpo Laggo Glacier

References

External links 
 The Shaksgam river marked on the OpenStreetMap, Upper course: 1, 2, 3, 4, 5, 6, 7; Lower course: 1, 2 3, 4, 5

Tashkurgan Tajik Autonomous County
Rivers of Xinjiang
Rivers of Gilgit-Baltistan
Karakoram
China–Pakistan border
Rivers of Pakistan